Jamshid Afshar is an Iranian retired fighter pilot who flew with Grumman F-14 Tomcat during the Iran–Iraq War. He has been credited him with 5 or 6 confirmed aerial victories, a record that qualifies him as a flying ace.

Career 
Afshar was part of the second group of Iranian pilots who were sent to the United States for training in June 1974. He ranked captain at the time he was assigned to the VFA-101 of the Naval Air Station Oceana. He played a key role in planning Operation Sultan 10, along with Major H. Shoghi.

Aerial victories 

Cooper and Bishop have verified the following six as confirmed kills of Afshar:

See also 

 List of Iranian flying aces

References 

Iran–Iraq War flying aces
Iranian flying aces
Living people
Year of birth missing (living people)
Islamic Republic of Iran Air Force personnel
Iranian military personnel of the Iran–Iraq War